Wolverine (James Howlett) is a fictional character appearing in books published by Marvel Comics. He is an alternative version of Wolverine that appears in the Ultimate Marvel imprint, in stories separate from the original character. Created by writer Mark Millar and artist Adam Kubert (based on the original character created by Roy Thomas, Len Wein and John Romita Sr.), Ultimate Wolverine first appeared in Ultimate X-Men #1 (February 2001).

Fictional character biography

Early years
Wolverine suffered from amnesia. As a result, what little was known about his early life was both suspect and unverifiable. It is believed that, at one point, Wolverine had a wife or girlfriend, but she was supposedly murdered by Sabretooth. As both Wolverine's and Sabretooth's memories had been tampered with in the past (most commonly by the Weapon X), this claim was highly suspect; however, Wolverine did own a wedding ring that served as his only link to his past. He also owned dogtags. One side read 'Logan' and the other side 'Wolverine'.

Captain America recognized Wolverine as James Howlett, a paratrooper he had made several jumps with during World War II. He was called "Lucky Jim" because he always survived, no matter how gravely he was injured. Dum-Dum Dugan also recognized him as Jim although how he knew him has not yet been specified.

Ultimate Origins depicts Nick Fury and Kingpin's unnamed grandfather as looting a house for its goods only to be caught and taken hostage. Tests were conducted on Fury to see if he was a candidate to become a super soldier, and a little over a year later Howlett was also tested but escaped. Howlett's newly activated mutant abilities kicked in. This was considered the dawn of the mutant race, and Howlett was named "Mutant Zero." At some point in later years he was captured by Erik Lensherr's parents in a plan to 'cure' the mutant gene. When Lensherr discovered the plot he helped to free Wolverine, but not before killing his mother and father. Years later he was experimented on by Weapon X who gave him his adamantium claws by Malcolm Colcord.

Weapon X
Wolverine was kidnapped by John Wraith, a mutant-hating commando, and head of the Weapon X Project. His memory was erased and was given the fake name "Logan". He was often tortured and tormented by Wraith and his guards. It was during this time his skeletal structure was bonded with Adamantium. While being deployed in the desert during the Gulf War, the vehicle he was in was ambushed, and Wolverine was set loose from his cage. He slaughtered the enemies and came across Nick Fury, the only other survivor, who was injured. Logan carried him back to base, though he was then shot and caged once again. Wraith was surprised that his "living weapon" still retained his humanity.

A couple years later, Logan broke out of Weapon X with the help of Fury, who never forgot about the man who saved his life.

Logan later traveled to the Balkan Mountains. After being overwhelmed by a snow storm, he was taken in by a woman named Magda aka "The Witch of Wundagore". While recovering, Logan had intercourse with Magda, but was interrupted by her current boyfriend Eric Lensherr. Using his powers, Lensherr quickly dispatched Logan- hurling him from the mountain forcing him to wander in the wild alone.

Years later, Wolverine joined Magneto's Brotherhood of Mutant Supremacy, and eventually became Magneto's elite assassin.

Joining the X-Men
Eighteen months later, Logan was assigned to infiltrate the X-Men and assassinate Professor X. He was accepted into their ranks, and quickly seduced Jean Grey in order to further entrench himself within the team. However, Wolverine accidentally fell in love with Jean, and was devastated when she left him upon discovering his connection to the Brotherhood. Wolverine eventually betrayed Magneto, abandoning his initial mission and truly joined the X-Men after coming to understand and believe in Xavier's cause.

Seeking answers to Wolverine's past (and to liberate imprisoned mutant test subjects), the team traveled to the site of the Weapon X Project. There they encountered Wraith - and Sabretooth. Sabretooth burned the files on Wolverine - and thus destroyed the only record of his past - in front of his eyes, leading up to the first match-up between the two. At first, Sabretooth appeared to be winning, until Wolverine scored a dirty hit (slashing Sabretooth in the groin). The battle culminated with Sabretooth's plunge off of a cliff and the complete dismantlement of the Weapon X Project.

Unfortunately, by this time, Jean had begun a relationship with Cyclops, leading to a deep rift growing between the two men. Their rivalry came to a head when Xavier sent the two of them on a mission to the Savage Land, hoping to end their enmity. However, the reverse occurred: Wolverine allowed Cyclops to fall to his death, believing he would then be able to continue his relationship with Jean.

Miraculously, Cyclops survived, and returned, revealing Wolverine's hand in his disappearance. Cyclops blasted Wolverine to the ground, and then shocked everyone by offering to let him remain on the team (his only chance of redemption).

This experience had a profound effect upon Logan. He realized how badly he had betrayed his friends and ceased his antisocial, ruthless ways, and even developed a deep and abiding sense of responsibility. He also displayed a protective side for the younger X-Men, namely Rogue, and even eventually formed a bond of friendship - or at least mutual respect - with Cyclops.

Wolverine's nemesis was far from destroyed as Sabretooth returned as a member of the Brotherhood of Mutant Supremacy, replacing Wolverine at Magneto's side. After a fierce battle, Sabretooth began to taunt Wolverine, saying that he could never be killed, could recover from any injury, and would always return to haunt Wolverine - to which Wolverine responded by decapitating him on the spot.

Wolverine later began a half-hearted relationship with Storm, which he quickly ended. However, they both still harbored feelings for one another, and on a future "date", the couple were attacked by a revived Sabretooth (sporting a scar around his neck).

Sabretooth began to explain how he managed to survive thanks to a few little threads Wolverine neglected to cut, but was rendered comatose for several months. He engaged Wolverine in a brief encounter, until Storm separated the two, inadvertently allowing Sabretooth to take her hostage. Sabretooth said he hadn't come to fight, and revealed that, since his resurrection, his original memories had begun to return. He had become able to determine which memories were fake, as well. He also claimed that Wolverine was his biological father. This claim is unverified.

Ultimate Wolverine Vs. Hulk

Wolverine was contacted by Nick Fury, who was concerned that the Hulk may have survived S.H.I.E.L.D.'s attempt to execute him. Fury assigned Wolverine to find the Hulk, who S.H.I.E.L.D. believed to be in Tibet, and eliminate him. Wolverine tracked down the Hulk in Tibet, where he greeted him. To Wolverine's surprise Banner is in complete control of himself as the Hulk. Hulk and Wolverine exchange words, with Hulk belittling Wolverine's intelligence, and also revealed that Fury ordered the Ultimates to kill Logan if he ever abandons the X-Men. Logan then informed Hulk that Betty Ross wants him dead, angering Hulk. Wolverine is about to leave but then asked if he could ask Betty out which infuriated Hulk to attack Wolverine.

After a vicious exchange, the Hulk gained the upper hand and proceeded to rip Wolverine in half. Wolverine survived, and began the long climb up a mountainside to retrieve his legs. Unfortunately for Logan the Hulk is already there when Wolverine arrives. Hulk says that he will eat one of his legs in order to force Wolverine to leave Hulk alone, but Wolverine says that he will never stop chasing Bruce until he kills him. Then She-Hulk arrives and confronts an angry Hulk, Wolverine reattaches his legs as Hulk attacks an atomic bomb sent by Fury. Fury then decapitated Wolverine, demanding information, which Logan did not completely give. Locked in the Triskelion, Wolverine met Forge (a former Brotherhood member), and the two escaped. Wolverine reunited with Betty Ross in a hotel room. Ross transformed into She-Hulk and attacked Wolverine, but Wolverine quickly stabbed She-Hulk, which left her in critical condition. Ross begged Wolverine to spare Bruce, but he refused

Later, Logan went to the airport where Bruce was, got on the same plane, and sat next to him. Logan put a collar made by Forge on Bruce, telling him that if he turns into Hulk while the collar is on him, he will choke to death. Bruce asks why Logan simply won't just kill him and get it over with, and Logan says that he didn't want to kill Bruce, he wanted to kill the Hulk. Bruce said that he did not deserve the treatment and that he was a good person, but Logan replied that he is a bad person and that it is irrelevant what either person deserves.

Bruce said that he does not believe that Logan is a bad person and will prove it. Bruce then said that he wouldn't change, and then jumped out of the airplane emergency exit in mid-flight. Logan jumped out after him screaming at him to turn into the Hulk or the fall would kill him. Bruce said that he would only change if Logan would cut off the collar, or else Logan would have to deal with the fact that he simply let "Bruce," and not the "Hulk" fall to his death. Logan, not wanting to be responsible for Bruce's death, shows his moral side and breaks the collar. Bruce transforms into the Hulk, holds Logan, and lands on his feet with no harm done to either of them. Nick Fury showed up and told them that they were free to go. Fury angrily warns Wolverine that he is now on his %^&* list, but Wolverine states that he is on humanity's %^&* list. Hulk let Fury go, who then left. In the middle of the desert, Hulk and Logan calmly discuss getting back to civilization, and Hulk agrees to pick up Logan and jump to the nearest town to drop him off.

Pre-Ultimatum / Banshee
Wolverine found out that he was dosed with Banshee and goes to Peter Parker for help. He discovered that he wasn't actually dosed, but that properties of the drug were derived from him. Because certain members of the X-Men like Angel, Colossus, Dazzler, Nightcrawler, and Rogue became Banshee addicts with Angel gaining a humanoid eagle form, Colossus getting strong enough to move his metallic form, Dazzler creating solid light constructs, Nightcrawler teleporting greater distances, and Rogue touching things without draining it's lifeforce, the non-addicted members were forced to fight them and prevent them from using it. When Jean fell unconscious, he violently attacked Colossus, but soon cooled off. He then discovered that Xavier and Magneto were responsible for the creation of the power-enhancing drug and that Moira MacTaggert was distributing it. Moira fought him, though he destroyed the facility in which Banshee was produced in.

Ultimatum and Death 

Wolverine is forced to travel to the Savage Land to find the brainwashed Multiple Man and kill him, to stop the waves of Multiple Man suicide bombers worldwide. He vows to do the same thing to Magneto. When the X-Men and the Ultimates finally confront Magneto, Wolverine charges towards his foe, slashing him multiple times before Magneto overrides Iron Man's armor and Cyclops' visor to unleash full strength blasts from both to incinerate Wolverine. Believing him to be dead, Magneto gets too close to gloat before Wolverine. The nearly fleshless Wolverine jumps up and stabs his claws into Magneto's chest, mortally wounding him. Magneto rips the Adamantium from Wolverine's bones, killing Wolverine, leaving just a severely charred skeleton and an arm of flesh due to his healing factor not working. Cyclops would later avenge Wolverine's death by killing Magneto Shadowcat returns to Triskelion to find Wolverine's fleshless arm (the one that was left in Magneto after Wolverine was killed). Shadowcat returns to the site of the mansion with Wolverine's arm and adds it to the grave of the fallen X-Men.

Legacy
After Wolverine's death, it was revealed he had a biological son with Magda named Jimmy Hudson. Hudson inherited the claws, healing factor, and facial hair of his father and in addition to these he inherited a unique ability of his own an ability to coat his bone claws with a liquid metal similar to adamantium. After the Ultimate Universe is destroyed, Hudson moves into Earth-616.

Powers and abilities
Wolverine has a healing factor that allows him to recover from wounds fairly quickly. Wolverine's healing factor makes him capable of surviving without his legs or even his head attached to his body. Wolverine's healing factor was not strong enough in the end to defend Wolverine from having himself be obliterated by Magneto who tears the adamantium from his body. Wolverine's mutant power in the Ultimate Universe has been described as the ability to "survive" as opposed to just "heal". It is commonly thought that Wolverine's death in Ultimatum was counter to continuity, as previously Wolverine had survived being ripped in half, decapitation, and a nuclear explosion.

Wolverine also has a keen sense of smell and is able to detect lies.

Other versions
In an alternate future labeled Earth-2107, Logan goes by the name Cable.  

Howlett known as Cable's life was identical to the present time Wolverine, until Apocalypse arrived and battled the X-Men. Many of the team died during the battle, and Apocalypse absorbed Cable's healing factor and ripped off his left arm. Some time after the battle was over with Apocalypse the victor, Cable's left arm was used against him and it scarred his face. Because of his lack of healing factor, the scarring on his face remained. Cable then spent the next three decades fighting Apocalypse until he finally found a way to travel back in time, and as soon as he could Cable traveled back 30 years to correct the past.
Cable traveled from the future, appearing before Charles Xavier. Cable prepared to kill Xavier, claiming it to be necessary. However, he hesitated, allowing Charles to defend himself telekinetically. 

Xavier asked Cable how he was blocking Charles' telepathy, but the man refused to reveal how, calling it a "secret". Cable then tossed a small device at Xavier, which attached itself to his head and (painfully) rendered him powerless. However, Kitty then arrived, and phased Cable through the floor. Cable stabbed her in the gut, and warned her not to become solid again, not even enough to remove the knife, or she will bleed to death. He then apologized for putting her in this situation. Cable proceeded to face each of the X-Men, defeating them all: he knocked Colossus unconscious, deflected Cyclops's blasts with his metal arm (burying Cyclops in rubble), defeated Jean Grey with the same device he used against Xavier, and attacked Storm with a device that turned her own powers against her.

When he was attacked by Wolverine, he held his own for a while, until the X-Man flew into a rage, attacking Cable mercilessly, until he was pushed back, speechless from the claw marks crossing his chest.
Cable was then revealed to have unsheathed claws identical to Wolverine's from his organic arm. As the X-Men believed the Professor to be dead, Cable actually transported him back to the future to prepare him for the battle with Apocalypse. Bishop, who had pretended that he was against Cable, was trying to build an X-team strong enough to defeat Apocalypse under orders of the US Government. When they returned to the present, S.H.I.E.L.D. was attacking Apocalypse, who defeated them with ease. 

While Apocalypse was able to repel all attacks with ease, the armored Xavier/Onslaught convinced Jean to aid as Cable in his own armor pleads to Bishop and his team. Meanwhile Jean was momentarily shocked about the professor being back, and Jean, Cyclops, Toad, and Iceman were no longer in Apocalypse's control due to Xavier's honed abilities. Cable revealed that he and Bishop were in it together all along and that Professor X was the key to stopping Apocalypse. Wolverine jumped in at the end of Cable's explanation and told them all to start fighting. Professor X and Jean shared a tender moment on a rocky peak, told her what to do and then Apocalypse jumps in. Xavier tried to wipe out Apocalypse psychically, but Cable's plan backfires as Apocalypse somehow resisted. Apocalypse destroyed Xavier's helmet, giving him a bloody nose, and as he was about to kill Cable, Xavier used his enhanced telekinesis but to little effect.

As Apocalypse was about to kill Xavier, Jean begged the Phoenix God to help him, to which it told her it knew she would eventually beg for it. The Phoenix was then unleashed and Jean destroyed Apocalypse, reverting him back into Nathaniel Essex/Sinister, followed by her making sure no one remembers Apocalypse except for the X-Men. The people who had died came back to life and Wolverine's body/healing factor were fully restored, effectively diverting the possibility of his becoming this version of himself.

In other media

Television
In X-Men: Evolution, Wolverine (voiced by Scott McNeil) sports the Ultimate version of his costume in Seasons 3 & 4.

Video games
 Wolverine appears in the video game  Ultimate Spider-Man, voiced by Keith Szarabajka. When Venom attacks a bar, Wolverine comes out of the bathroom to find Venom and engages him in battle after finding out that Venom used Wolverine's motorcycle to smash up the bar. Venom manages to defeat Wolverine.
 The Ultimate Marvel costume of Wolverine has been featured in a variety of X-Men video games, normally as an alternate costume. These include X-Men Legends, X-Men Legends II: Rise of Apocalypse, Marvel: Ultimate Alliance, and X2: Wolverine's Revenge.

References

External links
 Wolverine of Earth-1610 at Marvel Wiki

Canadian superheroes
Characters created by Adam Kubert
Characters created by Mark Millar
Comics characters introduced in 2001
Fictional assassins in comics
Fictional Canadian Army personnel
Fictional Canadian people in comics
Fictional Canadian secret agents
Fictional characters from Alberta
Fictional characters from parallel universes
Fictional characters with amnesia
Fictional characters with superhuman senses
Fictional fist-load fighters
Fictional mass murderers
Fictional mercenaries in comics
Fictional World War II veterans
Marvel Comics characters with accelerated healing
Marvel Comics characters with superhuman strength
Marvel Comics martial artists
Marvel Comics mutants
Marvel Comics military personnel
Marvel Comics superheroes
Ultimate Marvel characters
Ultimate Wolverine
X-Men members
Fictional characters displaced in time
Marvel Comics cyborgs
Time travelers